Operation Nicety was an operation in September 1942 during the Second World War by Force Z a battalion of the Sudan Defence Force. It was designed to support the raiding forces taking part in Operation Agreement, Operation Caravan and Operation Bigamy. The objective of the operation was the seizure of the Jalo oasis in the Libyan desert to support the withdrawal of the forces involved in the other operations.  The operation was a failure: the Germans had discovered the plans for all four operations on the body of a dead officer taking part in Operation Agreement.  Forewarned, the Italian garrison at Jalo had been warned and reinforced which easily repelled the attack on the night 15–16 September.

References

Molinari, Andrea.Desert raiders; Axis and Allied Special Forces 1940–43. Botley, UK: Osprey Publishing, 2007.

Further reading

Imperial War Museum Documents 9017 Private Papers. The War Memories of Major PJ Hurman page 20

Conflicts in 1942
World War II British Commando raids
Battles of World War II involving Italy
Battles of World War II involving the United Kingdom